Time and Tide is the debut studio album by Polish singer-songwriter Basia, released by Epic Records in 1987. The album includes the hit singles "Promises", "New Day for You", and the title track.

Overview
Time and Tide was Basia's first solo album following her and Danny White's departure from the band Matt Bianco. The pair co-produced and mostly co-wrote the material themselves, although Peter Ross of Immaculate Fools contributed to five songs on the album. The record showcases considerable influences from Brazilian music, noted in the track "Astrud", a tribute to Astrud Gilberto.

Six songs were released as singles to promote the record, with "Promises", "New Day for You", and the album's title track being the most successful. All three tracks achieved success on the U.S. adult contemporary chart and the latter was also Basia's first song to break the Top 40 of the Billboard Hot 100.

The album was released in April 1987 in Europe by Portrait Records (CBS) and on 21 August 1987 in the United States by Epic Records. It turned out a considerable success in France where it was certified gold, but performed poorly in the UK and Germany, much to Basia and Danny's disappointment, considering their previous success with Matt Bianco in those markets. The album, however, started to get noticed in the U.S., where it found popularity on the new adult contemporary stations. In December 1987, it was included in Billboards list of "overlooked pop albums that deserved more attention" compiled by Geoff Mayfield. Originally, Epic Records did not have big expectations towards the album and their target was to sell 10,000 copies. The figure took the label bosses by surprise when it quickly rose to 100,000 and eventually one million. The album was subsequently awarded a platinum sales certification by the Recording Industry Association of America in November 1989 for selling one million copies in the U.S. alone. Time and Tide was followed by the even more successful London Warsaw New York. In 2013, the album was re-released by independent UK label Cherry Red Records as 2 CD deluxe edition featuring instrumental versions and remixes.

Track listing

Personnel 
Musicians
 Basia Trzetrzelewska – vocals
 Danny White – keyboards and bass programming
 Andy Ross – guitars
 Peter White – guitars
 Tony Beard – drums
 Bob Jenkins – drums, percussion
 Robin Jones – drums, percussion
 Ray Carless – saxophones
 Steve Gregory – saxophones, flute
 Ronnie Ross – baritone saxophone
 Guy Barker – trumpet
 Kevin Robinson – trumpet

Production 
 Producers – Basia Trzetrzelewska and Danny White
 Recorded by Peter Brown, Gerry Kitchingham and John Lee.
 Assistant engineers – Dave Anderson, Michael "Mog" Fry, Simon Gall and Brendon Lynch.
 Recorded at R.G. Jones Studio, Power Plant Studios and Utopia Studios (London, England).
 Mixed by Phil Harding at PWL Studios (London, England).
 Mix assistants – Jamie Broomfield, Mike Duffy and Gary Costa.
 Mastered by Tim Young at The Hit Factory (London, England).
 Artwork – Stylorouge
 Photography – Paul Cox
 Make-up – Louise Constad

Charts

Weekly charts

Year-end charts

Certifications

References

External links
 The official Basia website
 Time and Tide on Discogs

1987 debut albums
Basia albums
Epic Records albums